Damiano Lia (born 25 November 1997) is an Italian professional footballer who plays as a right back for Vibonese.

Club career
Born in Lentini, Sicily, Lia started his career on ACR Messina youth sector. In 2015, he was loaned to Serie D club SC Ligorna, on this team he made his senior debut.

He left the club in the 2016–17 season, and joined to Serie D club Sicula Leonzio. He won the promotion to Serie C this year, however, he return to ACR Messina on Serie D.

On 23 August 2018, he signed for Serie C club Cavese. Lia made his professional debut on 16 September 2018 against Casertana.

He played one season with Cavese. In June 2019 he joined Serie B club Juve Stabia. On 9 January 2020, he was loaned to Sicula Leonzio. The next season, he returned to Juve Stabia, this time in Serie C.

On 10 January 2020, he returned to Sicula Leonzio.

On 28 August 2021, he signed with Imolese, on Serie C.

In December 2022, Lia signed for Vibonese.

References

External links
 
 

1997 births
Living people
People from Lentini
Sportspeople from the Province of Syracuse
Footballers from Sicily
Italian footballers
Association football fullbacks
Serie C players
Serie D players
A.C.R. Messina players
A.S.D. Sicula Leonzio players
Cavese 1919 players
S.S. Juve Stabia players
Imolese Calcio 1919 players
U.S. Vibonese Calcio players